Critical Ops (abbreviated as C-OPS) is a multiplayer first-person shooter video game developed, and published by Critical Force Ltd. It was released as Open Alpha in September 2015 for Android and had been in the Open Beta until the official release (version 1.0) in November 2018. Critical Ops is currently available on Google Play (for Android), Apple App Store (for iOS), and Amazon Appstore. Previously, it was available on PC through the Facebook Gameroom platform until July 10, 2017.

Critical Ops core gameplay is heavily influenced by the Counter-Strike series.

NHN Entertainment Corporation and Critical Force distributed Critical Ops as now-defunct Critical Ops: Reloaded in South Korea and in several countries of Asia.

Gameplay 
Two opposing teams of Coalition (representing counter-terrorism units) and The Breach (representing terrorism units) compete against each other. A team wins by either completing specified objectives, or by eliminating the other team. The game features other game modes such as Team Deathmatch, Ranked Defuse and Event Modes. Players can also choose to host customized rooms and join rooms hosted by other players using Custom Matches.

Ranks
Critical ops players can get 10 ranks- Unranked, Iron, Bronze, Silver, Gold, Platinum, Diamond, Master, Special Ops (i.e Spec ops), and Elite Ops.

Currency and Crates 
The game uses three kinds of in-game currency, blue tokens, credits, and special event tokens. The tokens can be used to unlock skins. In order to get tokens you need to discard duplicates of a skin. There are also credits, which are used to open cases. There are three types of crates, standard, premium, and special event crates. There are also special event tokens that you can earn by converting duplicate special event skins into event tokens. Credits can be purchased in the store or can be earned for free by doing various tasks, i.e: watching advertisements, completing offers (by downloading and completing the tasks given for the game), and completing milestones for each weapon.

Weapons
Critical ops has a variety of weapons. The groups of weapons are mainly- Grenades, Knives, Pistols, Submachine Gun, Assault Rifle, Shotguns and Sniper Rifles. 
 Grenades consist of the Flash, Frag and Smoke Grenades.
 Pistols consist of the P250, XD.45, Dual MTX, GSR1991, MR96 and the Desert Eagle (Deagle).
 Submachine guns consist of Vector, MP5, MPX, MP7 and P90.
 Assault rifles consist of the AK-47, SA-58, Aug, M4, Scar-H, AR-15, SG-551 and the HK417.
 Shotguns consist of Super 90, FP6, KSG and M1887.
 Sniper Rifles consist of U-Ratio, SVD, M14, and TRG 22
 The knives consist of the Default, Karambit, Balisong, Kukri, Pipe Wrench, Meat Cleaver, Tac-Tool, Tactical Axe, Short Sword, Remix, Trench knife, Tomahawk and the Dragonmourn.

Passes
Passes offer various skins for completing each level. There are two types of passes- Free and Elite Passes. The Free pass is available for all players, however, it has fewer skins compared to the Elite pass. The Elite pass can be bought for 1400 credits. The pass consists of 30 levels, and each level has a skin and the end of the pass usually has higher-tier skins. The last season pass was released in update 1.34.0. In 1.35.0 was released an Operation, its like Critical Pass but with more tiers. In these Operations are 100 tiers. Currently there is 2nd Operation.The first Operation was Operation Frontier

Skins 
There are various skins that can be applied on weapons for customization. These skins come in different rarities.  The rarities are as follows in order; Tier 1, Tier 2, Tier 3, Tier 4, Tier 5, Tier 6, and finally, Tier 7. These skins can be earned through the purchase of crates with in-game credits. When a duplicate skin is received, it is discarded for tokens.

References

External links 
 

Esports games
Android (operating system) games
IOS games
Multiplayer video games
First-person shooters
Multiplayer online games
Video games about police officers
Video games about terrorism
Video games containing loot boxes
Video games developed in Finland